Hellinsia aldabrensis is a moth of the family Pterophoridae. It was described by Thomas Bainbrigge Fletcher in 1910 and is known from the Seychelles in the Indian Ocean.

References

aldabrensis
Fauna of Seychelles
Moths described in 1910
Moths of Africa